The 1972–73 Bulgarian Cup was the 33rd season of the Bulgarian Cup (in this period the tournament was named Cup of the Soviet Army). CSKA Sofia won the competition, beating Beroe Stara Zagora 2–1 in the final at the Vasil Levski National Stadium.

Preliminary round

|-
!colspan=3 style="background-color:#D0F0C0;" |1972

|}

First round

|-
!colspan=3 style="background-color:#D0F0C0;" |20–21 December 1972

|}

Group stage

Group 1
Matches were played in Haskovo, Dimitrovgrad and Parvomay

|-
!colspan=3 style="background-color:#D0F0C0;" |10–17 February 1973

|}

Group 2
Matches were played in Panagyurishte, Velingrad, Stamboliyski and Pazardzhik

|-
!colspan=3 style="background-color:#D0F0C0;" |10–17 February 1973

|}

Group 3
Matches were played in Petrich, Sandanski, Razlog and Gotse Delchev

|-
!colspan=3 style="background-color:#D0F0C0;" |10–17 February 1973

|}

Group 4
Matches were played in Nova Zagora, Kazanlak, Stara Zagora and Chirpan

|-
!colspan=3 style="background-color:#D0F0C0;" |10–17 February 1973

|}

Quarter-finals

Semi-finals

Final

Details

References

1972-73
1972–73 domestic association football cups
Cup